Marcin Mielczarek (born 11 November 1982) is a paralympic athlete from Poland competing mainly in category T36 sprint and long jump events.

Mielczarek competed in all three sprint events in the 2004 Summer Paralympics winning the bronze medal in the T36 400m. He also competed in the 100m and 200m at the 2008 Summer Paralympics in Beijing but missed out on a medal in both events.

References

Paralympic athletes of Poland
Athletes (track and field) at the 2004 Summer Paralympics
Athletes (track and field) at the 2008 Summer Paralympics
Athletes (track and field) at the 2012 Summer Paralympics
Paralympic bronze medalists for Poland
Living people
1982 births
Medalists at the 2004 Summer Paralympics
Place of birth missing (living people)
Paralympic medalists in athletics (track and field)